ESSL may refer to:
 European Severe Storms Laboratory, a non-profit organization dedicated to basic and applied research on severe convective storms
 The ICAO code of Linköping/Saab Airport in Sweden